FACT complex subunit SSRP1 also known as structure specific recognition protein 1 is a protein that in humans is encoded by the SSRP1 gene.

Function 

The protein encoded by this gene is a subunit of a heterodimer that, along with SUPT16H, forms chromatin transcriptional elongation factor FACT. FACT interacts specifically with histones H2A/H2B to effect nucleosome disassembly and transcription elongation. FACT and cisplatin-damaged DNA may be crucial to the anticancer mechanism of cisplatin. This encoded protein contains a high mobility group box which most likely constitutes the structure recognition element for cisplatin-modified DNA. This protein also functions as a co-activator of the transcriptional activator p63.

Interactions 

Structure specific recognition protein 1 has been shown to interact with NEK9.
SSRP1 further interacts with transcriptional activator p63. SSRP1 enhances the activity of full-length p63, but it has no effect on the N-terminus-deleted p63 (DeltaN-p63) variant.

References

Further reading

External links 
 

Transcription factors